Adaptive scalable texture compression (ASTC) is a lossy block-based texture compression algorithm developed by Jørn Nystad et al. of ARM Ltd. and AMD.

Full details of ASTC were first presented publicly at the High Performance Graphics 2012 conference, in a paper by Olson et al. entitled "Adaptive Scalable Texture Compression".

ASTC was adopted as an official extension for both OpenGL and OpenGL ES by the Khronos Group on 6 August 2012.

Hardware support 

On Linux, all Gallium 3D drivers have a software fallback since 2018, so ASTC can be used on any AMD Radeon GPU.

Overview 

The method of compression is an evolution of Color Cell Compression with features including numerous closely spaced fractional bit rates, multiple color formats, support for high-dynamic-range (HDR) textures, and real 3D texture support.

The stated primary design goal for ASTC is to enable content developers to have better control over the space/quality tradeoff inherent in any lossy compression scheme. With ASTC, the ratio between adjacent bit rates is of the order of 25%, making it less expensive to increase quality for a given texture.

Encoding different assets often requires different color formats. ASTC allows a wide choice of input formats, including luminance-only, luminance-alpha, RGB, RGBA, and modes optimized for surface normals. The designer can thus choose the optimal format without having to support multiple different compression schemes.

The choices of bit rate and color format do not constrain each other, so that it's possible to choose from a large number of combinations.

Despite this flexibility, ASTC achieves better peak signal-to-noise ratios than PVRTC, S3TC, and ETC2 when measured at 2 and 3.56 bits per texel. For HDR textures, it produces results comparable to BC6H at 8 bits per texel.

Supported color formats 

Each of these may be encoded as low or high dynamic range. The encoder selects color formats independently for each block in the image.

2D block footprints and bit rates 

ASTC textures are compressed using a fixed block size of 128 bits, but with a variable block footprint ranging from 4×4 texels up to 12×12 texels. The available bit rates thus range from 8 bits per texel down to 0.89 bits per texel, with fine steps in between.

In the above table, the "Increment" column shows the additional storage required to store a texture using this bit rate, as compared to the next smallest. Block footprints are presented as width × height.

3D block footprints and bit rates 

ASTC 3D textures are compressed using a fixed block size of 128 bits, as for 2D but with a variable block footprint ranging from 3×3×3 texels up to 6×6×6 texels. The available bit rates thus range from 4.74 bits per texel down to 0.59 bits per texel, with fine steps in between.

Block footprints are presented as width × height × depth.

See also 
 3Dc

References

External links 
 High Performance Graphics 2012
 ASTC Texture Compression: ARM Pushes the Envelope in Graphics Technology
 ARM Unveils Details of ASTC Texture Compression at HPG Conference
 ASTC Evaluation Codec from ARM
 Khronos ASTC Full Profile Extension Specification
 UASTC (Universal ASTC) Texture Specification

Lossy compression algorithms
Texture compression
AMD technologies